The Daily Report was a newspaper published in Ontario, California, under private ownership between 1885 and 1965 and group ownership from 1965 to 1990.

Private ownership

History
The newspaper's first issue, under the title Ontario Record, was in December 1885, published by brothers E.P. Clarke, editor of the Riverside Daily Press, and A.F. Clarke. The first issue was printed in Pomona.

The newspaper changed its name to The Daily Republican and then to The Daily Report in 1910. It was sold by F.E. Unholz and associates in October 1911 to brothers H.L. and Crombie Allen of Greensburg, Pennsylvania.

By 1912, Crombie Allen had become editor. In that year, a contract was let by H.L. and Crombie Allen for a one-story office building to be built at the corner of A Street and Lemon Avenue in Ontario. By 1920, Crombie Allen was the publisher. A new building was constructed at 212 East B Street in 1929 and was extensively remodeled in 1957.

On August 1, 1930, the Allen brothers, owners, announced the sale of the newspaper to Mr. and Mrs. Frank B. Appleby, from La Grande, Oregon, who had moved to Ontario with two young sons. Appleby had published newspapers in Washington, Iowa, and in La Grande.

Appleby died at the age of 39 or 40 on July 26, 1936, in the family summer home in Laguna Beach. His obituary in the Los Angeles Times noted that the Daily Report "is known as one of the most progressive and attractive-looking newspapers in Southern California." At that time, the circulation was about 4,000. His wife, Jerene C., took over as publisher of the newspaper. She later married architect J. Dewey Harnish and was thenceforth known as Jerene Appleby Harnish.

R.F. Graettinger was managing editor for many years, retiring in 1942, when he was succeeded by Curtis H. Clay, who came from the La Salle (Illinois) Post-Tribune.

The newspaper company also owned a radio station, KOCS, both AM and FM.

Controversies

Chamber of Commerce

Between 1947 and 1949, the newspaper campaigned for "broader industrialization" of the Ontario area and complained that the local Chamber of Commerce was a private group, organized to benefit business and professional people of the city. As such, the newspaper said, the chamber was not legally entitled to maintain its office in the city hall and demanded that it be ousted. The City Council rejected the request.

Civil Defense

In 1952, the Daily Report company announced it would no longer cooperate with a Civil Defense informational program because the Ontario Planning Commission had denied a zoning variance to permit the enlargement of the Report's radio station.

Oregon Smith

In 1953, Mrs. Harnish and other partners of the Daily Report sued Ontario City Councilman Oregon Smith for slander because Smith said at a City Council meeting that the newspaper "without question" had been following "the Communist Party line". Superior Judge Raymond H. Thompson decided in favor of Smith, whose attorney was California politician Jack B. Tenney. The judge dismissed the case because there was "no limitation" on the statements that a city council member could make during a meeting. The decision was upheld by a District Court of Appeals in January 1956 and later by the California Supreme Court.

Afterward the newspaper published an article on January 16, 1958, stating that, had the decision gone the other way, "the public would have no protection against malicious statements made by unscrupulous members of any minor legislative body." On March 3 an editorial claimed that Smith had made the charge of communism "without regard to good morals and honesty." Smith sued for $3 million, charging libel. He later amended the complaint to include the newspaper's references to him going back as far as 1949. Judge Jesse W. Curtis Jr. dismissed the complaint in February 1958.

Smith filed another suit in January or February 1957, alleging that the unsuccessful 1953 action against him by the Daily Report had been a malicious prosecution. He sought more than $1.5 million in damages.

This latter suit was dismissed by Judge Richard B. Ault of San Diego Superior Court on motion of attorney Tenney on behalf of Smith. Tenney told a reporter that an out-of-court settlement had been made, but a defense attorney denied the statement and said the plaintiff had moved for dismissal to avoid "long and costly court proceedings".

George Stromme

In 1983, promoter George Stromme filed suit against Ontario Mayor Charles Latimer and Jerene Appleby Harnish contending that the two intentionally interfered with a contract he had with the city to promote and operate an air show at the Ontario Municipal Airport. His complaint against the publisher centered on an article in The Daily Report quoting officials as stating that the air show had to be free to the public. He said he had planned to charge $1 admission but could not do so after the article, and so he lost money through the venture. Judge Russell Goodwin dismissed the complaint as being without substance.

Group ownership

History

On March 30, 1965, partners Jerene Appleby Harnish, Carlton R. Appleby, Andrew B. Appleby, Walter W. Axley, Philip A. Sawyer and Rolph Fairchild sold the newspaper company to the Pomona Progress-Bulletin. It was to be published by a new corporation with the same staff and officers as before; Mrs. Harnish was to have an honorary title as "publisher emeritus". The newspaper's daily circulation was about 28,000, and the sale price of the company was said to be $5 million.

Controversies

Gag order

The Daily Report, the Sun-Telegram and the Progress-Bulletin all objected to a gag order issued in December 1972 by a Superior Court judge forbidding publication of the names of prisoners at Chino's California Institution for Men who testified at a trial for a murder committed within the prison.

William McVittie

In October 31, 1974, California Assembly Speaker Leo T. McCarthy accused San Bernardino County District Attorney Lowell Lathrop, Municipal Court Judge Martin Hildreth, Assembly candidate Pete VanderPeel and The Daily Report of joining in a "political alliance" to affect the outcome of the forthcoming election in the 65th Assembly District.

On the same day, William McVittie, a candidate in that race, filed a libel suit against The Daily Report, over a story it had printed about McVittie's arrest on a misdemeanor charge of election code violations. The arrest charge was settled without going to trial, and there was no further action on the libel claim after McVittie won the election.

References

Defunct newspapers published in California